St. Georges Presbyterian Church is a historic Presbyterian church located on Main Street in St. Georges, New Castle County, Delaware.  It was built in 1844, and is a one-story, brick, temple form, Greek Revival style building with a frame steeple. The main block measures 43 feet, 6 inches wide by 77 feet, 8 inches long, and sits on an uncoursed fieldstone foundation.  The roof is supported by a Town lattice truss.

It was added to the National Register of Historic Places in 1984. It is located in the North Saint Georges Historic District.

References

Presbyterian churches in Delaware
Greek Revival church buildings in Delaware
Churches completed in 1844
19th-century Presbyterian church buildings in the United States
Churches in New Castle County, Delaware
Churches on the National Register of Historic Places in Delaware
National Register of Historic Places in New Castle County, Delaware
Individually listed contributing properties to historic districts on the National Register in Delaware